The 2014–15 Austrian Cup was the 81st season of Austria's nationwide football cup competition. It commenced with the matches of the First Round on 11 July 2014 and ended on 3 June 2015.

First round
The matches took place between 11 and 16 July 2014.

|-
| colspan="3" style="background:#fcc;"|

|-
| colspan="3" style="background:#fcc;"|

|-
| colspan="3" style="background:#fcc;"|

|-
| colspan="3" style="background:#fcc;"|

|}

Matches

Second round
The matches took place between 22 and 24 September 2014.

|-
| colspan="3" style="background:#fcc;"|

|-
| colspan="3" style="background:#fcc;"|

|-
| colspan="3" style="background:#fcc;"|

|}

Third round
The matches took place between 28 and 29 October 2014.

|-
| colspan="3" style="background:#fcc;"|

|-
| colspan="3" style="background:#fcc;"|

|}

Quarter-finals 
The matches took place on 7 and 8 April 2015.

|-

|}

Semi-finals 
The matches took place on 28 and 29 April 2015.

|-

|}

Final 
The final was played on 3 June 2015 at the Wörthersee Stadion in Klagenfurt.

|-

|}

Details

External links 

 

Austrian Cup seasons
Cup
Austrian Cup